Mount Vernon City Schools, District 80 is a school district headquartered in Mount Vernon, Illinois.

Schools
 Dr. Andy Hall Early Childhood Center (preschool)
 Mount Vernon City Schools Primary Center (K-3)
 J.L. Buford Intermediate Education Center (grades 4 and 5)
 Zadok Casey Middle School (grades 6–8)

References

External links
 Mount Vernon City Schools
Education in Jefferson County, Illinois
School districts in Illinois